Richard "Dick" Hope Simpson (1930–2016) was a British Classical archaeologist, known for his work in archaeological survey and the study of Mycenaean Greece. For most of his career, he taught at Queen's University at Kingston in Kingston, Ontario.

A leading figure in Greek field survey throughout the 1960s, 1970s and 1980s, Hope Simpson played a major role in the University of Minnesota Messenia Expedition and in the production of several of the key gazetteers of Mycenaean civilisation in Greece. His work was significant in allowing an understanding of Mycenaean states, particularly in Messenia, beyond the relatively small number of large, well-known and excavated sites. In the 1960s, his projects pioneered new methods of extensive survey, including the use of remote sensing via aerial photography.

Hope Simpson believed in the essential historicity of the Homeric epics and produced several works, including his doctoral thesis, attempting to locate the toponyms of the Iliad with the archaeological sites known from Mycenaean Greece. The archaeologist Sinclair Hood described him as 'an apostle of Common Sense'.

Early life and education

Hope Simpson was born on 12 May 1930, the middle of three brothers. His father, Dr. John Whitwell Hope Simpson, was a GP. He was a distant relative of Sir John Hope Simpson, the civil servant, MP and diplomat.

He studied literae humaniores (Classics) at St John's College in the University of Oxford, matriculating in 1950. After graduating, he remained at Oxford for the 1954–1955 academic year to pursue a Diploma in Classical Archaeology. His tutor was Dorothea Gray, to whom he later credited his interest in Greek prehistory, and with whom he would undertake some of his early survey work in Greece.

While at Oxford, he attended the British School at Athens' undergraduate summer course, where he met then-director Sinclair Hood.

He continued to the University of London to study for his Ph.D.. From 1956 to 1958, he returned to the British School at Athens on a School Studentship. He submitted his thesis, The topography of Mycenaean Greece in relation to the Achaean section of the Homeric Catalogue of the Ships, in November 1962.

Academic career

Early career: 1956–1960

In 1959, Hope Simpson was awarded the first Michael Ventris Memorial Award for Mycenaean Studies, given by the Institute of Classical Studies to promising young scholars in the field of Mycenaean or Minoan studies. He was most known and prolific in the field of archaeological survey, and his many contributions to large-scale landscape surveys of Mycenaean sites. In the spring of 1957, while still a doctoral student, he had completed a survey of the Spercheios Valley in Phthiotis in central Greece, alongside his frequent collaborator John Lazenby.

Between 1956 and 1958, he made an extensive survey of Laconia, including the islands of Kythera and Antikythera, alongside Helen Waterhouse and at the encouragement of Alan Wace. Like most of his future survey work, the expedition consisted largely of the collection and cataloguing of surface finds, with the view to identifying and mapping sites of Mycenaean habitation. The Laconia survey significantly increased the number of known Mycenaean sites in the region, and remained widely cited into the 21st century. In the spring of 1956–7, he spent seven weeks surveying in south-eastern Messenia, with the assistance of David French, and later published his work as 'Identifying a Mycenaean State', in which he linked his discoveries with the 'Seven Cities' promised to Achilles by Agamemnon in the Iliad. His belief in the essential correspondence between the place-names of the Homeric poems and the geography of the Mycenaean period led him to write, with John Lazenby, The Catalogue of Ships in Homer's Iliad, which attempted to match the places named in the Iliad with those known from archaeological survey. Contemporary reviews, however, questioned the value of the Catalogue as an historical document, pointing to its essentially poetic nature as well as its composition over many centuries, and most modern scholars consider the attempt to find archaeological evidence for the historicity of the Homeric poems to be fundamentally misguided.

Between 1960 and 1970, Hope Simpson and Lazenby worked together on a further survey of the Dodecanese.

The University of Minnesota Messenia Expedition

In 1958, he joined William McDonald in what would become the University of Minnesota Messenia Expedition, surveying Mycenaean sites in Messenia. The approach of this survey, which came to be known as the 'Hope Simpson method' (though McDonald always claimed it as a joint decision, even to later critics), typified his later work: broad, extensive survey based on surface finds; a focus on site function as well as distribution; and the recording of information relevant to as many periods of history as possible. By 1962, the expedition was formally constituted with a team of five: in addition to McDonald and Hope Simpson, three of McDonald's colleagues from the University of Minnesota: Jesse Fant, Herbert E. Wright and Fred Lukerman. From 1966 to 1968, owing to McDonald's illness, Hope Simpson served as field director of the project.

The methods of the UMME were innovative in several ways. Firstly, they made extensive use of aerial photography, provided by the Hellenic Air Force during the summers, to identify promising sites for investigation, enabling them to cover far more ground than previous surveys. Secondly, with the assistance of John Chadwick of the University of Cambridge, they attempted to match the sites identified in their survey to the toponyms known from the Linear B archive of the so-called 'Palace of Nestor' at Pylos, excavated by Carl Blegen in 1939 but only made legible with Chadwick and Michael Ventris' decipherment of the Linear B script, completed in 1952–1953 and published in 1956. While this approach was later criticised for its propensity to miss smaller sites, particularly those whose location did not conform to expected patterns of settlement, it revealed over 200 habitation sites across an area of 3,500 km2, and has been described as 'a prodigious influence on the development of archaeology in Greece', opening the possibility for the first time of the study of Mycenaean geography.

During the UMME season of August 1966, Hope Simpson travelled to the marble quarries at Kypranion in Laconia, recovering samples which he used in collaboration with Reynold Higgins and S.E. Ellis to demonstrate that these were the source for the red and green marble used on the façade of the Treasury of Atreus at Mycenae.

Teaching, research and survey: 1960–1991

Hope Simpson left London in 1960, and worked as a Research Fellow at the University of Birmingham until 1963, when he emigrated to Canada. He taught for a year at the University of Toronto before moving in 1964 to Queen's University, Kingston to take up a professorship in Classics and Archaeology, a position he would hold until his retirement in 1993.

Throughout the succeeding decades, Hope Simpson's main scholarly contribution was in the production of gazetteers of prehistoric sites throughout Greece. In 1965, he published A Gazetteer and Atlas of Mycenaean Sites, cataloguing over 600 sites throughout the Greek mainland and islands, as well as the coast of Asia Minor. In 1969, at the suggestion of Hector Catling, he began working with Oliver (O.T.P.K.) Dickinson, originally a Sir James Knott fellow at Newcastle University, from 1972 until 1975 a Research Fellow at the University of Birmingham, on what was published in 1979 as the first volume of A Gazetteer of Aegean Civilisation in the Bronze Age. He followed this in 1982 with Mycenaean Greece, a gazetteer in all but name, incorporating material from central Macedonia and more sites in Asia Minor. This publication was praised for its thorough coverage and inclusion of maps and plans, including an early effort to address the question of roads and routeways in Mycenaean Greece, which later formed the basis of his 2006 book (with D.K. Hagel), Mycenaean Fortifications, Highways, Dams and Canals. However, the book was criticised for adding few sites to the corpus of his 1979 work, and for failing to incorporate methodological advances in survey techniques since the early 1970s. By 1983, such large-scale gazetteers, making use of extensive survey to catalogue sites in a diachronic manner, could be described as 'the familiar Hope Simpson format'.

From 1977 to 1979, along with Joseph Shaw, he conducted the survey of the Kommos region of southern Crete — a survey which, by the time of the project's eventual publication in 1995, was noted as embodying the 'pioneering' methods of the UMME but as suffering from the lack of methods and techniques which had, in the intervening two decades, become standard in Greek field survey. In particular, the relatively unsystematic nature of the collection and interpretation of survey data was judged by Jack Davis as leading to 'methodological imprecision [which] often detracts from the potential usefulness of the data'. Indeed, by 1982, his methods which had been described as 'pioneering' for the 1950s and 1960s were labelled as 'cautious' and 'traditional'.

From 1985 to 1991, he directed the intensive survey of the island of Pseira, near Crete, uncovering 315 prehistoric sites ranging chronological from the Neolithic to the Byzantine period.From 1986 to 1988, he took part in the excavation of the fortified Mycenaean settlement of Kiapha Thiti in Attica, directed by the Canadian Institute in Greece — a rare example of a fortified non-palatial Mycenaean site, which provided evidence of construction techniques attested nowhere else in the Mycenaean world.

Later career and retirement

From 1990 to 1995, he served on the advisory board of the Pylos Regional Archaeological Project, led by Jack Davis, which aimed to supplement the work done by Hope Simpson and McDonald through the UMME survey with detailed, small-scale intensive study of Messenian sites and landscapes. He retired from Queen's University in 1993: in retirement, he published two further books, Mycenaean Fortification, Highways, Dams and Canals (2006, with D.K. Hagel) and Mycenaean Messenia and the Kingdom of Pylos (2014).

His final book, Mycenaean Greece and the Homeric Tradition, was published posthumously in open access in 2018.

Personal life

In 1958, Hope Simpson married Jennifer Crick. Throughout the 1950s, the couple had surveyed widely, both together and separately, in Greece, generating data which formed much of the foundation for Hope Simpson's 1965 gazetteer. They had two children: Allan Hope Simpson (1962-2012), a writer, poet and musician, and David (born 1965), an engineer.

Hope Simpson's younger brother, Robert, predeceased him. His elder brother, James (1928–2019), also read classics (at Queens' College, Cambridge) after attending Shrewsbury School. He had a long career as a schoolmaster in Britain, at The King's School, Canterbury, Bedford School and in the comprehensive sector.

Selected works

Books

 Mycenaean Greece and the Homeric Tradition (2018), Queen's University, Kingston.
 Mycenaean Messenia and the Kingdom of Pylos (2014). INSTAP Academic Press; Philadelphia.
 Mycenaean Fortifications, Highways, Dams and Canals (2006, with D.K. Hagel), Paul Åströms Förlag; Sävedalen.
 Mycenaean Greece (1982). Noyes Press; Park Ridge, New Jersey.
 A Gazetteer of Aegean Civilisation in the Bronze Age: Volume 1: The Mainland and Islands (1979, with O.T.P.K. Dickinson), Paul Åströms Förlag; Göteborg.
 The Catalogue of Ships in Homer's Iliad (1970, with John Lazenby). Clarendon Press; Oxford.
 A Gazetteer and Atlas of Mycenaean Sites (1965). Oxford University Press; Oxford.

Articles

 'Interdisciplinary survey in Messenia, Southwest Peloponnese, Greece', Geoarchaeology, Volume 22 (2006), pp. 111–120.
 'Notes from the Dodecanese' (with John Lazenby),The Annual of the British School at Athens, Volume 57 (1962), pp. 154–175.
 'Identifying a Mycenaean State', The Annual of the British School at Athens, Volume 52 (November 1957), pp. 231–259.

References

Bibliography

 
 
 
 
 
 
 
 
 
 
 
 
 
 
 
 
 
 
 
 
 
 
 

 
 
 
 
 

Archaeologists
1930 births
2016 deaths
Alumni of St John's College, Oxford
Alumni of the University of London
Archaeologists of the Bronze Age Aegean
Academic staff of the University of Toronto
Academic staff of Queen's University at Kingston
Academics of the University of Birmingham